Toomaj Salehi (born 3 December 1990) is an Iranian hip hop artist mostly known for his protest songs concerning Iran's societal issues and the policies of the government of the Islamic Republic of Iran.

According to Salehi, his day job is as a laborer at a metalworking factory.

Arrests 
Iran's security forces arrested Salehi on September 12, 2021, in his house in Shahin Shahr, near Isfahan. He was charged with 'propaganda against the regime' and 'insulting the supreme leadership authority.'
He was released on bail on September 21, pending a trial. On January 23, 2022, the Islamic Revolutionary Court of Shahin Shahr sentenced Salehi to six months in jail and a fine.

Salehi was arrested again on October 30, 2022, during the Mahsa Amini protests. Fars news agency, affiliated with the IRGC, described him as one of “the leaders of the riots who promoted violence.” The state media also said that Salehi was arrested during a border-crossing, a claim which was denied by Salehi's social media administrator, who announced that he was arrested in the province of Chaharmahal and Bakhtiari, not a border province.

Salehi was reportedly charged with "propagandistic activity against the government, cooperation with hostile governments and forming illegal groups with the intention of creating insecurity in the country". The state-backed Young Journalists Club published a video of a blindfolded man it claimed to be Toomaj who admitted, apparently under duress, to making "a mistake". Salehi was reportedly placed in Evin prison. According to his family, Iranian authorities have tortured Salehi while in captivity.

His last music YouTube video posted prior to his October 2022 arrest included the lyrics, "Someone's crime was dancing with her hair in the wind. Someone's crime was that he or she was brave and criticized... 44 years of your government. It's the year of failure."

On 26 November 2022, the family of Toomaj said his life was at risk after he went on trial behind closed doors. On 27 November, Iranian media revealed that Salehi was charged with "corruption on Earth", an offense which could carry the death penalty. Salehi was also accused of spreading propaganda, co-operating with a hostile government, and incitement to violence. According to Salehi's cousin Azadeh Babadi, Salehi was denied the right to hire a lawyer. Babadi believes the Iranian government is fabricating evidence.

German member of parliament Ye-One Rhie has become his sponsor with an aim to improve conditions during his imprisonment and prevent execution.

See also 
‌Mahsa Amini protests
Detainees of the September 2022 Iranian protests
Human rights in Iran

Sources

External links 
 
 
 Toomaj Salehi on Telegram
 
 Toomaj Salehi on Spotify
 Toomaj Salehi on YouTube
 Toomaj's Music Videos playlist on YouTube
 https://freetoomajsalehi.com/ The International Campaign to Free Toomaj Salehi 

Iranian prisoners and detainees
Iranian singer-songwriters
Iranian male singers
Iranian rappers
People from Isfahan
Living people
Iranian composers
1990 births